Indian English has developed a number of dialects, distinct from the General/Standard Indian English that educators have attempted to establish and institutionalise, and it is possible to distinguish a person's sociolinguistic background from the dialect that they employ.  These dialects are influenced by the different languages that different sections of the country also speak, side by side with English.  The dialects can differ markedly in their phonology, to the point that two speakers using two different dialects can find each other's accents mutually unintelligible.

Indian English is a "network of varieties", resulting from an extraordinarily complex linguistic situation in the country.  (See Official languages of India.)  This network comprises both regional and occupational dialects of English.  The widely recognised dialects include Malayali English, Telugu English, Maharashtrian English, Punjabi English, Bengali English, Hindi English, alongside several more obscure dialects such as Butler English (a.k.a. Bearer English), Babu English, and Bazaar English and several code-mixed varieties of English.

The formation of these regional/socio-economic dialects is the same form of language contact that has given rise to Scottish English.

Babu English 
Babu English  (a.k.a. Baboo English), the name originally coming from the Bengali word for a gentleman, is a dialect of English that first developed as an occupational dialect, amongst clerks in the Bengali-speaking areas of pre-Partition India.  Originally characterised as a markedly ornate form of administrative English, it is now no longer confined solely to clerks, and can be found in Nepal, north India, and in some social circles in south India.

The distinguishing characteristics of Babu English are the florid, excessively polite, and indirect manner of expression, which have been reported for amusement value, in works such as Cecil Hunt's Honoured Sir collections (see Further reading), and lampooned, in works such as F. Antesey's Baboo Jabberjee, B.A., for over a century.

Butler English 

Butler English, also known as Bearer English or Kitchen English, is a dialect of English that first developed as an occupational dialect in the years of the Madras Presidency, but that has developed over time and is now associated mainly with social class rather than occupation. It is still spoken in major metropolitan cities.

The dialect of Butler English is singular. Therefore, the present participle is used for the future indicative, and the preterite. For example, for the preterite indicative "done", "I telling" translates to "I will tell", "I done tell" to "I have told", and "done come" to "actually arrived". This form of Indian English was used both by masters for speaking to their servants as well as by servants to speak to their masters.

Hindi English 

Hinglish (the name is a combination of the words "Hindi" and "English") is a macaronic language, a hybrid of British English and South Asian languages – it is a code-switching variety of these languages whereby they are freely interchanged within a sentence or between sentences. While the name is based on the Hindi language, it does not refer exclusively to Hindi, but "is used in India, with English words blending with Punjabi, and Hindi, and also within British Asian families to enliven standard English." It is predominantly spoken in Northern India and some parts of Mumbai and Bangalore.

Modern phonologists often divide Indian English into five major varieties.

Assamese English
Assamese English refers to the English spoken by Assamese speakers.
Some major difference between Assamese English and British English are mostly seen in some consonants. In Assamese English all vowels are usually short.

Bengali English
Bengali English (or eastern Indian English) here refers collectively to the varieties of the West Bengal state and neighbouring country  of Bangladesh, which has been greatly influenced by Bengali. Its main subdivisions are Calcutta English as well as Dhaka English. It is similar or even identical to Bangladeshi English, also known as Banglish or Benglish.

 as fronted, more closely approaching  but  between nasal and velar e.g. mug.
, almost always, as monophthong .

West Indian English
West Indian English  here refers to a traditional variety spoken in the western part of India. 
 as monophthongal .
 as monophthongal .

Cultivated Indian English
Cultivated Indian English here refers collectively to non-localised, non-working class, and more recent varieties of India and the surrounding region of India. It includes mainstream Indian English, a widely common, upper-class variety that preserves a few local Indian features while setting the basis for an otherwise General Indian English accent as well as new Cultivated Indian English, a youthful variety beginning in the 2000s.  However, both are found rarely in India.

Southern Indian English

Southern Indian English here refers to rural, broad varieties of India's south Regions. 
 as monophthongal . 
 as monophthongal .
 as 

General Indian English

General Indian English  here refers to a variety originating outside of the island's eastern regions and southern regions, crossing regional boundaries throughout the Republic of India. As mentioned earlier, Cultivated Indian English is almost entirely this General Indian dialect but with a few features more of Received Pronunciation.

See also
 Code-switching
 English language
 Hinglish
 Kanglish or Bangalorean English 
 Manglish
 Interlanguage
 List of dialects of the English language
 Tanglish
 Tenglish

References

Further reading 
 
 
 (Indian Novels in English: A Sociolinguistic Study) Jaydeep Sarangi, Prakash Book Depot,Bareilly,2005 Pp 214.

Babu English

Malayali English

Tamilian English

Punjabi English

Rajasthani English

Telugu English 
 

Indian English
Indian English